"You'll Rock" is a single by LL Cool J from his debut album, Radio. It was released in 1985 for Def Jam Recordings and was produced and written by Rick Rubin and LL Cool J. The song would prove to be the least successful of the four singles released from the album, only peaking at #59 on the Hot R&B/Hip-Hop Songs.

Track listing

A-side
"I Need a Beat"- 4:59

B-side
"You'll Rock" (Remix)- 4:32

References

1985 singles
LL Cool J songs
Songs written by LL Cool J
Song recordings produced by Rick Rubin
1985 songs
Songs written by Rick Rubin
Def Jam Recordings singles